The statue of William Slim, 1st Viscount Slim in Whitehall, London, is a work of 1988–1993 by the sculptor Ivor Roberts-Jones. It is one of three memorials to British military leaders of World War II on Raleigh Green, outside the Ministry of Defence's Main Building, the others being Oscar Nemon's 1980 statue of Lord Montgomery and Roberts-Jones's statue of Lord Alanbrooke, erected later in 1993.

History
The campaign to erect a memorial to Slim was launched by the Burma Star Association in early 1988, when eight sculptors were invited to submit designs for a statue. Of these, five agreed to compete: Roberts-Jones, James Butler, David Norris, Christopher Marvell and Michael Rizzello. An appeal for subscriptions was launched in The Independent newspaper on 28 June, by which time planning permission had been obtained for a site near the statue of Montgomery on Whitehall. The competition's assessors requested that the artists respect the wishes of the second Viscount Slim to depict his father "as all the troops who served under his command in Burma will remember him ... in Bush hat and jungle dress".

Roberts-Jones's winning competition entry was singled out for praise by Slim's widow, who thought that the sculptor had got "Bill's stance and jawline just right", and by his son. The artist had himself fought under Slim in the Burma Campaign of World War II and was a member (albeit an inactive one) of the Suffolk branch of the BSA. Roberts-Jones regarded the field marshal as "the one genuine hero I have ever personally laid eyes on"; his encounter with Slim had occurred "in a paddy field on the road to Mandalay (in March 1945)". He would periodically re-read Slim's memoirs Defeat into Victory and Unofficial History, and apparently based the statue's pose on a photograph of Slim reproduced in his own copy of the former book.

The statue was unveiled by Queen Elizabeth II on 28 April 1993; the Queen was reported as having remarked on the day that it was "not before time" for such a tribute. The sculpture was of particular personal significance to Roberts-Jones; his assistant Brian Jarvis observed that the work was a "labour of love" for the elder artist, and Roberts-Jones was satisfied at the prospect of having Slim's statue "to be remembered by". The maquette for the statue is in the collection of the Henry Moore Institute in Leeds.

Inscriptions

The inscriptions on the Portland stone pedestal were carved by David Kindersley.

References

Bibliography

External links

 Plaque: Slim statue at London Remembers

1993 establishments in England
1993 sculptures
Bronze sculptures in the United Kingdom
Limestone sculptures in the United Kingdom
Military memorials in London
Outdoor sculptures in London
Sculptures of men in the United Kingdom
Slim
Whitehall